Pázmándfalu is a village in Győr-Moson-Sopron county, Hungary.

In the 14th century it was property of the Cseszneky family.

References

External links 
 Street map 
 Pazmandfalu homepage

Populated places in Győr-Moson-Sopron County